Chani Nicholas (born 1975) is a Canadian astrologer and activist.

Early life and education 
Nicholas was born and raised in British Columbia, Canada. She became interested in astrology when she was 12 after her first astrology reading.

At age 20, she moved to Los Angeles to pursue acting. After deciding to leave the industry, she enrolled at the California Institute of Integral Studies where she completed her bachelor's degree. During this time, she began to study feminists such as bell hooks and grew her interest in social justice.

Career
Nicholas began her career by writing a weekly astrology newsletter to friends and family in 2011. Her work focuses on progressive values and marginalized communities, such as queer and trans people. Nicholas appeared on the fourteenth episode of the Netflix series Explained, "Astrology" in 2018, and she was the "resident astrologer" on Oprah Magazine's website.

Her first book, You Were Born For This: Astrology for Radical Acceptance was released by HarperCollins on January 7, 2020. In an interview with KCRW, Nicholas stated that she hoped to "write a book that would help people access the wisdom of their chart so that they could more quickly align with living out their purpose. And so that we could all be, again, more quickly of service to the world." The book debuted at #8 on the New York Times Best Seller list.

In December 2020, Nicholas launched an iPhone app called CHANI where users can receive astrology information.

Personal life 
Nicholas is married to Sonya Passi, the founder of Freefrom, a national organization working to financially empower survivors of domestic violence. They reside in Los Angeles.

Works 
 You Were Born For This: Astrology for Radical Acceptance (2020), HarperCollins;

References

External links 
Official website

1975 births
Living people
21st-century astrologers
21st-century Canadian women writers
Canadian astrologers
Canadian LGBT writers
Writers from British Columbia
21st-century Canadian LGBT people